Valkamdinni also spelled as Walkamdinni is a village in the Sindhanur taluk of Raichur district in the Indian state of Karnataka. Valkamdinni is located near to Pothnal stream joining Tungabhadra river. Valkamdinni lies on road connecting Pothnal-Ayanur.

Demographics
As of 2001 India census, Valkamdinni had a population of 1,330 with 665 males and 665 females and 256 Households.

See also
Ragalaparvi
Pothnal
Puldinni
Olaballari
Sindhanur
Raichur

References

External links
 http://raichur.nic.in

Villages in Raichur district